Skivvy may refer to:
 Undergarments, (primarily in the United States)
 Polo neck or turtle neck shirt,  (primarily in the United States and Australasia)
 Maid, servant, or person at the bottom of the social order (primarily in Britain)